The 2002 Grand Prix Hassan II was a tennis tournament played on outdoor clay courts at the Complexe Al Amal in Casablanca in Morocco and was part of the International Series of the 2002 ATP Tour. It was the 18th edition of the tournament and was held from 8 April through 14 April 2002.

Finals

Singles

 Younes El Aynaoui defeated  Guillermo Cañas 3–6, 6–3, 6–2
 It was El Aynaoui's 2nd title of the year and the 4th of his career.

Doubles

 Stephen Huss /  Myles Wakefield defeated  Martín García /  Luis Lobo 6–4, 6–2
 It was Huss's only title of the year and the 1st of his career. It was Wakefield's only title of the year and the 1st of his career.

External links
 Official website 
 ATP tournament profile

 
Grand Prix Hassan II
Grand Prix Hassan II